The Collégiale Saint-Étienne (Collegiate Church of St. Stephen) is a Gothic building in Hombourg-Haut, department of Moselle, in the cultural and historical region Lorraine, Grand Est.

History 
After the establishment of the Chapter of the collegiate by James of Lorraine, bishop of Metz in 1254, the church was erected during the 13th-14th centuries. It probably replaced an earlier church.

Although it was damaged by a fire in 1632, it was spared from destruction during the Thirty Years War and the 1789 revolution.

Cultural value 
The church is registered as a French national heritage site and has become the symbol of the city of Hombourg-Haut. 

1847 a new organ was installed by Pierre Rivinach. In 1906 the instrument was extended by the Dalstein-Haerpfer company. In 1992 it was restored by the organ builder Michel Gaillard (Aubertin).

The stained glass windows include works by the 20th century master glass maker Jean-Henri Couturat, second 1925 Prix de Rome.

From the fifteens onwards the collegiate church served as a major venue for the classical music concerts in Hombourg-Haut. The Saint-Cecilia choir is the official choir of the church and sings the masses. It also gives concerts.
The Friends of the organ (non-profit association) regularly organises concerts as well as the Choeur d'hommes de Hombourg-Haut, the oldest male choir in the region Lorraine.
Most of the concerts of the Théodore Gouvy international Festival take place in the Gothic building.

See also 
Théodore Gouvy International Festival

References

Sources

External links 
 Tourisme Lorraine

Hombourg-Haut
Roman Catholic churches in France